Manfred Albrecht Freiherr von Richthofen (2 May 1892 – 21 April 1918), widely known as the Red Baron, is considered the ace-of-aces of the First World War, being officially credited with 80 air combat victories, more than any other pilot of the war – before being killed in action near Amiens on 21 April 1918.

As the following list demonstrates, his victories are well documented. Victories are against English flyers unless otherwise noted. The † indicates death.

Sources: Franks, Giblin & McCrery 2000; The Aerodrome n.d.

Citations

Bibliography

External links
 Manfred von Richthofen and victory list in The Aerodrome
Did Red Baron shoot down Suffolk Pilot?

Victories
Aerial victories of Richthofen, Manfred von
Richthofen, Manfred von

ca:Manfred von Richthofen#Víctimes